The IPSC South American Championship are IPSC championships hosted in South America.

History 
 1989 Sao Paulo, Brazil
 1994 Buenos Aires, Argentina
 1997 Caracas, Venezuela

Champions 
Ricardo Balzano (Argentino) Campeón Sudamericano (Open)
 
Diana Drapajlo (Argentina) Campeona Sudamericana (Open)

Overall category

References

IPSC shooting competitions
Shooting sports in South America
Sports competitions in South America